Little Bowden is an area on the edge of Market Harborough and former civil parish, now in the unparished area of Market Harborough, in the Harborough district, in the county of Leicestershire, England. As a village it was formerly part of Northamptonshire. The River Jordan runs through part of the area. Now, it's been integrated into Market Harborough and is fully part of the town using the town's address of 'Market Harborough'. In 1921 the parish had a population of 2768. On 1 April 1927 the parish was abolished and merged with Market Harborough.

Amenities
Two pubs, The Cherry Tree and The Oat Hill (formerly The Greyhound)
The 13th-century Church of England parish church of Saint Nicholas, which is part of the Diocese of Leicester.
Little Bowden County Primary School
Little Bowden Recreation Ground, which is the home ground of Harborough South Cricket Club.

Windy Ridge
Windy Ridge is a hill near Little Bowden. The area was often used for walks by local people. There were several attempts to build on Windy Ridge, all of which had been opposed by residents concerned by the effect development may have on the skyline and hazardous effects of battery landfill. However, the most recent proposal to build on this land was accepted by the council and is now completed.

The new estate built upon Windy Ridge by Redrow Homes is called Rockingham View.

A further scheme of development has received planning permission for another 400 homes.

References

Further reading

External links

Little Bowden Society
St Nicholas parish church webpage

Villages in Leicestershire
Former civil parishes in Leicestershire
Market Harborough